Where the Truth Lies (French: Maléfices) is a 1962 French thriller film directed by  Henri Decoin and starring  Juliette Gréco, Jean-Marc Bory and Liselotte Pulver.

Cast
 Juliette Gréco as Myriam Heller  
 Jean-Marc Bory  as François Rauchelle  
 Liselotte Pulver  as Catherine Rauchelle  
 Mathé Mansoura  as Ronga  
 Jacques Dacqmine  as Vial  
 Jeanne Pérez  as Mother Capitaine  
 Georges Chamarat  as Malet  
 Robert Dalban   as Butcher  
 Marcel Pérès as Chauvin

Remake
The Boileau-Narcjeac novel was filmed again for television in 1990. It was directed by Carlo Rola and starred Pierre Malet, Iris Berben and Susanne Lothar.

References

Bibliography 
 Hans-Michael Bock and Tim Bergfelder. The Concise Cinegraph: An Encyclopedia of German Cinema. Berghahn Books.

External links 
 

1962 films
French thriller films
1960s thriller films
1960s French-language films
Films based on works by Boileau-Narcejac
Films directed by Henri Decoin
Gaumont Film Company films
1960s French films